Mantur  is a village in the southern state of Karnataka, India. It is located in the Mudhol taluk of Bagalkot district in Karnataka.

Demographics
 India census, Mantur had a population of 6297 with 3,174 males and 3,123 females.

See also
 Bagalkot
 Districts of Karnataka

References

External links
 http://Bagalkot.nic.in/

Villages in Bagalkot district